This is a list of curling clubs in New Zealand. The vast majority of these clubs are based in the southern South Island, with most of them being in Central Otago. Only two of the listed teams are from the North Island (both in Auckland).

Alexandra Curling Club – Alexandra
Alpine Curling Club – Lauder
Arrow Curling Club – Arrowtown
Auckland Curling Club – Auckland
Balmoral Curling Club – Ranfurly
Becks Curling Club – Becks
Black Ice Curling Club – Timaru
Blackstone Hill Curling Club – Oturehua
Cambrian Curling Club – Alexandra
Cardrona Curling Club – Wanaka
Chatto Creek Curling Club – Alexandra
Curling Canterbury – Christchurch
Dunedin Curling Club – Dunedin
Dunedin Country Curling Club – Dunedin
Dunstan Creek Curling Club – Omakau
Garibaldi Curling Club – Ranfurly
Gore Curling Club – Gore
Hamiltons Curling Club – Ranfurly
Kiwi Curling Club – Naseby
Kyeburn Curling Club – Ranfurly
Lauder Curling Club – Lauder
Lowburn Curling Club – Cromwell
Mackenzie Curling Club – Fairlie
Manorburn Curling Club – Alexandra
Metro Jets – Auckland
Mount Ida Curling Club – Ranfurly
Naseby Curling Club – Naseby
Otago Central Curling Club – Naseby
Oturehua Curling Club – Oturehua
Pioneer Curling Club – Naseby
Poolburn Curling Club – Poolburn
Ranfurly Curling Club – Ranfurly
Rough Ridge Curling Club – Oturehua
Serpentine Curling Club – Paerau
Upper Manuherikia Curling Club – Omakau
Wedderburn Curling Club – Ranfurly
West Coast Curling Club - Greymouth
Whitestone Curling Club – Oamaru
Windwhistle Curling Club – Windwhistle

References

New Zealand
Clubs
Curling